Chilobrachys andersoni, commonly known as the Burmese mustard tarantula, or Burmese Brown, is a species of spider of the genus Chilobrachys. It is found in India, Myanmar, Thailand and Malaysia.

See also 
 List of Theraphosidae species

References

Theraphosidae
Spiders of Asia
Spiders described in 1895